Angelo G. Iacono  is a Canadian Liberal politician, who was elected to represent the riding of Alfred-Pellan in the House of Commons of Canada in the 2015 federal election.

Iacono attended McGill University, earning a Bachelor of Arts degree in political science, and then studied law at both the Université du Québec à Montréal (civil law) and the University of Ottawa (common law), as well as attending the University of Lyon in France.

Iacono was the Liberal Party's candidate in Alfred-Pellan during the 2011 federal election, finishing third.  He ran again in the 2015 federal election, and won.

Electoral record

References

External links
 Official Website

1973 births
Living people
Liberal Party of Canada MPs
Members of the House of Commons of Canada from Quebec
Canadian people of Italian descent
McGill University alumni
University of Ottawa alumni
Université du Québec à Montréal alumni
Lawyers from Montreal
University of Lyon alumni
Politicians from Montreal
21st-century Canadian politicians